Alexander I (– ) was the emperor of Russia from 1801, the first king of Congress Poland from 1815, and the grand duke of Finland from 1809 to his death in 1825. He was the eldest son of Emperor Paul I and Sophie Dorothea of Württemberg.

The son of Grand Duke Paul Petrovich, later Paul I, Alexander succeeded to the throne after his father was murdered. He ruled Russia during the chaotic period of the Napoleonic Wars. As prince and during the early years of his reign, Alexander often used liberal rhetoric, but continued Russia's absolutist policies in practice. In the first years of his reign, he initiated some minor social reforms and (in 1803–04) major liberal educational reforms, such as building more universities. Alexander appointed Mikhail Speransky, the son of a village priest, as one of his closest advisors. The Collegia were abolished and replaced by the State Council, which was created to improve legislation. Plans were also made to set up a parliament and sign a constitution.

In foreign policy, he changed Russia's position towards France four times between 1804 and 1812 among neutrality, opposition, and alliance. In 1805 he joined Britain in the War of the Third Coalition against Napoleon, but after suffering massive defeats at the battles of Austerlitz and Friedland, he switched sides and formed an alliance with Napoleon by the Treaty of Tilsit (1807) and joined Napoleon's Continental System. He fought a small-scale naval war against Britain between 1807 and 1812 as well as a short war against Sweden (1808–09) after Sweden's refusal to join the Continental System. Alexander and Napoleon hardly agreed, especially regarding Poland, and the alliance collapsed by 1810. Alexander's greatest triumph came in 1812 when Napoleon's invasion of Russia proved to be a catastrophic disaster for the French. As part of the winning coalition against Napoleon, he gained territory in Finland and Poland. He formed the Holy Alliance to suppress revolutionary movements in Europe which he saw as immoral threats to legitimate Christian monarchs. He also helped Austria's Klemens von Metternich in suppressing all national and liberal movements.

During the second half of his reign, Alexander became increasingly arbitrary, reactionary, and fearful of plots against him; as a result he ended many of the reforms he made earlier. He purged schools of foreign teachers, as education became more religiously driven as well as politically conservative. Speransky was replaced as advisor with the strict artillery inspector Aleksey Arakcheyev, who oversaw the creation of military settlements. Alexander died of typhus in December 1825 while on a trip to southern Russia. He left no legitimate children, as his two daughters died in childhood. Neither of his brothers wanted to become emperor. After a period of great confusion (that presaged the failed Decembrist revolt of liberal army officers in the weeks after his death), he was succeeded by his younger brother, Nicholas I.

Early life

Alexander was born at 10:45, on 23 December 1777 in Saint Petersburg, and he and his younger brother Constantine were raised by their grandmother, Catherine. He was baptized on 31 December in Grand Church of the Winter Palace by mitred archpriest Ioann Ioannovich Panfilov (confessor of Empress Catherine II), his godmother was Catherine the Great and his godfathers were Joseph II, Holy Roman Emperor and Frederick the Great. He was named after Saint Petersburg patron saint - Alexander Nevsky.  Some sources allege that she planned to remove her son (Alexander's father) Paul I from the succession altogether. From the free-thinking atmosphere of the court of Catherine and his Swiss tutor, Frédéric-César de La Harpe, he imbibed the principles of Rousseau's gospel of humanity. But from his military governor, Nikolay Saltykov, he imbibed the traditions of Russian autocracy. Andrey Afanasyevich Samborsky, whom his grandmother chose for his religious instruction, was an atypical, unbearded Orthodox priest. Samborsky had long lived in England and taught Alexander (and Constantine) excellent English, very uncommon for potential Russian autocrats at the time.

On 9 October 1793, when Alexander was still 15 years old, he married 14-year-old Princess Louise of Baden, who took the name Elizabeth Alexeievna. His grandmother was the one who presided over his marriage to the young princess. Until his grandmother's death, he was constantly walking the line of allegiance between his grandmother and his father. His steward Nikolai Saltykov helped him navigate the political landscape, engendering dislike for his grandmother and dread in dealing with his father.

Catherine had the Alexander Palace built for the couple. This did nothing to help his relationship with her, as Catherine would go out of her way to amuse them with dancing and parties, which annoyed his wife. Living at the palace also put pressure on him to perform as a husband, though he felt only a brother's love for the Grand Duchess. He began to sympathize more with his father, as he saw visiting his father's fiefdom at Gatchina as a relief from the ostentatious court of the empress. There, they wore simple Prussian military uniforms, instead of the gaudy clothing popular at the French court they had to wear when visiting Catherine. Even so, visiting the tsarevich did not come without a bit of travail. Paul liked to have his guests perform military drills, which he also pushed upon his sons Alexander and Constantine. He was also prone to fits of temper, and he often went into fits of rage when events did not go his way.

Tsarevich
Catherine's death in November 1796, before she could appoint Alexander as her successor, brought his father, Paul, to the throne. Alexander disliked him as emperor even more than he did his grandmother. He wrote that Russia had become a "plaything for the insane" and that "absolute power disrupts everything". It is likely that seeing two previous rulers abuse their autocratic powers in such a way pushed him to be one of the more progressive Romanov tsars of the 19th and 20th centuries. Among the rest of the country, Paul was widely unpopular. He accused his wife of conspiring to become another Catherine and seize power from him as his mother did from his father. He also suspected Alexander of conspiring against him, despite his son's earlier refusal to seize power from Paul.

Emperor

Ascension
Alexander became Emperor of Russia when his father was assassinated 23 March 1801. Alexander, then 23 years old, was in the palace at the moment of the assassination and his accession to the throne was announced by General Nicholas Zubov, one of the assassins. Historians still debate Alexander's role in his father's murder. The most common theory is that he was let into the conspirators' secret and was willing to take the throne but insisted that his father should not be killed. Becoming emperor through a crime that cost his father's life would give Alexander a strong sense of remorse and shame.

Alexander I succeeded to the throne on 23 March 1801 and was crowned in the Kremlin on 15 September of that year.

Domestic policy 

The Orthodox Church initially exercised little influence on Alexander's life. The young emperor was determined to reform the inefficient, highly centralised systems of government that Russia relied upon.  While retaining for a time the old ministers, one of the first acts of his reign was to appoint the Private Committee, comprising young and enthusiastic friends of his own—Viktor Kochubey, Nikolay Novosiltsev, Pavel Stroganov and Adam Jerzy Czartoryski—to draw up a plan of domestic reform, which was supposed to result in the establishment of a constitutional monarchy in accordance with the teachings of the Age of Enlightenment.

A few years into his reign the liberal Mikhail Speransky became one of the emperor's closest advisors, and he drew up many plans for elaborate reforms. In the Government reform of Alexander I the old Collegia were abolished and new Ministries were created in their place, led by ministers responsible to the Crown. A Council of Ministers under the chairmanship of the Sovereign dealt with all interdepartmental matters. The State Council was created to improve the technique of legislation. It was intended to become the Second Chamber of representative legislature. The Governing Senate was reorganized as the Supreme Court of the Empire. The codification of the laws initiated in 1801 was never carried out during his reign.

Alexander wanted to resolve another crucial issue in Russia, the status of the serfs, although this was not achieved until 1861 (during the reign of his nephew Alexander II). His advisors quietly discussed the options at length. Cautiously, he extended the right to own land to most classes of subjects, including state-owned peasants, in 1801 and created a new social category of "free agriculturalist," for peasants voluntarily emancipated by their masters, in 1803. The great majority of serfs were not affected.

When Alexander's reign began, there were three universities in Russia, at Moscow, Vilna (Vilnius), and Dorpat (Tartu). These were strengthened, and three others were founded at St. Petersburg, Kharkiv, and Kazan. Literary and scientific bodies were established or encouraged, and his reign became noted for the aid lent to the sciences and arts by the Emperor and the wealthy nobility. Alexander later expelled foreign scholars.

After 1815 the military settlements (farms worked by soldiers and their families under military control) were introduced, with the idea of making the army, or part of it, self-supporting economically and for providing it with recruits.

Views held by his contemporaries

Called an autocrat and "Jacobin", a man of the world and a mystic, Alexander appeared to his contemporaries as a riddle which each read according to his own temperament. Napoleon Bonaparte thought him a "shifty Byzantine", and called him the Talma of the North, as ready to play any conspicuous part. To Metternich he was a madman to be humoured. Castlereagh, writing of him to Lord Liverpool, gave him credit for "grand qualities", but added that he is "suspicious and undecided"; and to Jefferson he was a man of estimable character, disposed to do good, and expected to diffuse through the mass of the Russian people "a sense of their natural rights". In 1803, Beethoven dedicated his Opus 30 Violin Sonatas to Alexander who in response gave the famous composer a diamond at the Congress of Vienna where they met in 1814.

Napoleonic Wars

Alliances with other powers
Upon his accession, Alexander reversed many of the unpopular policies of his father, Paul, denounced the League of Armed Neutrality, and made peace with Britain (April 1801). At the same time he opened negotiations with Francis II of the Holy Roman Empire. Soon afterwards at Memel he entered into a close alliance with Prussia, not as he boasted from motives of policy, but in the spirit of true chivalry, out of friendship for the young King Frederick William III and his beautiful wife Louise of Mecklenburg-Strelitz.

The development of this alliance was interrupted by the short-lived peace of October 1801, and for a while it seemed as though France and Russia might come to an understanding. Carried away by the enthusiasm of Frédéric-César de La Harpe, who had returned to Russia from Paris, Alexander began openly to proclaim his admiration for French institutions and for the person of Napoleon Bonaparte. Soon, however, came a change. La Harpe, after a new visit to Paris, presented to Alexander his Reflections on the True Nature of the Consul for Life, which, as Alexander said, tore the veil from his eyes and revealed Bonaparte "as not a true patriot", but only as "the most famous tyrant the world has produced". Later on, La Harpe and his friend Henri Monod lobbied Alexander, who persuaded the other Allied powers opposing Napoleon to recognise Vaudois and Argovian independence, in spite of Bern's attempts to reclaim them as subject lands. Alexander's disillusionment was completed by the execution of the duc d'Enghien on trumped up charges. The Russian court went into mourning for the last member of the House of Condé, and diplomatic relations with France were broken off. Alexander was especially alarmed and decided he had to somehow curb Napoleon's power.

Opposition to Napoleon
In opposing Napoleon I, "the oppressor of Europe and the disturber of the world's peace," Alexander in fact already believed himself to be fulfilling a divine mission. In his instructions to Niklolay Novosiltsov, his special envoy in London, the emperor elaborated the motives of his policy in language that appealed little to the prime minister, William Pitt the Younger. Yet the document is of great interest, as it formulates for the first time in an official dispatch the ideals of international policy that were to play a conspicuous part in world affairs at the close of the revolutionary epoch. Alexander argued that the outcome of the war was not only to be the liberation of France, but the universal triumph of "the sacred rights of humanity". To attain this it would be necessary "after having attached the nations to their government by making these incapable of acting save in the greatest interests of their subjects, to fix the relations of the states amongst each other on more precise rules, and such as it is to their interest to respect".

A general treaty was to become the main basis of the relations of the states forming "the European Confederation". While he believed the effort would not attain universal peace, it would be worthwhile if it established clear principles for the prescriptions of the rights of nations. The body would assure "the positive rights of nations" and "the privilege of neutrality," while asserting the obligation to exhaust all resources of mediation to retain peace, and would form "a new code of the law of nations".

1807 loss to French forces

Meanwhile, Napoleon, a little deterred by the Russian autocrat's youthful ideology, never gave up hope of detaching him from the coalition. He had no sooner entered Vienna in triumph than he opened negotiations with Alexander; he resumed them after the Battle of Austerlitz (2 December). Russia and France, he urged, were "geographical allies"; there was, and could be, between them no true conflict of interests; together they might rule the world. But Alexander was still determined "to persist in the system of disinterestedness in respect of all the states of Europe which he had thus far followed", and he again allied himself with the Kingdom of Prussia. The campaign of Jena and the battle of Eylau followed; and Napoleon, though still intent on the Russian alliance, stirred up Poles, Turks and Persians to break the obstinacy of the Tsar. A party too in Russia itself, headed by the Tsar's brother Constantine Pavlovich, was clamorous for peace; but Alexander, after a vain attempt to form a new coalition, summoned the Russian nation to a holy war against Napoleon as the enemy of the Orthodox faith. The outcome was the rout of Friedland (13/14 June 1807). Napoleon saw his chance and seized it. Instead of making heavy terms, he offered to the chastened autocrat his alliance, and a partnership in his glory.

The two Emperors met at Tilsit on 25 June 1807. Napoleon knew well how to appeal to the exuberant imagination of his new-found friend. He would divide with Alexander the Empire of the world; as a first step he would leave him in possession of the Danubian principalities and give him a free hand to deal with Finland; and, afterwards, the Emperors of the East and West, when the time should be ripe, would drive the Turks from Europe and march across Asia to the conquest of India, a realization of which was finally achieved by the British a few years later, and would change the course of modern history. Nevertheless, a thought awoke in Alexander's impressionable mind an ambition to which he had hitherto been a stranger. The interests of Europe as a whole were utterly forgotten.

Prussia
The brilliance of these new visions did not, however, blind Alexander to the obligations of friendship, and he refused to retain the Danubian principalities as the price for suffering a further dismemberment of Prussia. "We have made loyal war", he said, "we must make a loyal peace". It was not long before the first enthusiasm of Tilsit began to wane. The French remained in Prussia, the Russians on the Danube, and each accused the other of breach of faith. Meanwhile, however, the personal relations of Alexander and Napoleon were of the most cordial character, and it was hoped that a fresh meeting might adjust all differences between them. The meeting took place at Erfurt in October 1808 and resulted in a treaty that defined the common policy of the two Emperors. But Alexander's relations with Napoleon nonetheless suffered a change. He realised that in Napoleon sentiment never got the better of reason, that as a matter of fact he had never intended his proposed "grand enterprise" seriously, and had only used it to preoccupy the mind of the Tsar while he consolidated his own power in Central Europe. From this moment the French alliance was for Alexander also not a fraternal agreement to rule the world, but an affair of pure policy. He used it initially to remove "the geographical enemy" from the gates of Saint Petersburg by wresting Finland from Sweden (1809), and he hoped further to make the Danube the southern frontier of Russia.

Franco-Russian alliance

Events were rapidly heading towards the rupture of the Franco-Russian alliance. While Alexander assisted Napoleon in the war of 1809, he declared plainly that he would not allow the Austrian Empire to be crushed out of existence. Napoleon subsequently complained bitterly of the inactivity of the Russian troops during the campaign. The tsar in turn protested against Napoleon's encouragement of the Poles. In the matter of the French alliance he knew himself to be practically isolated in Russia, and he declared that he could not sacrifice the interest of his people and empire to his affection for Napoleon. "I don't want anything for myself", he said to the French ambassador, "therefore the world is not large enough to come to an understanding on the affairs of Poland, if it is a question of its restoration".

Alexander complained that the Treaty of Vienna, which added largely to the Duchy of Warsaw, had "ill requited him for his loyalty", and he was only mollified for the time being by Napoleon's public declaration that he had no intention of restoring Poland, and by a convention, signed on 4 January 1810, but not ratified, abolishing the Polish name and orders of chivalry.

But if Alexander suspected Napoleon's intentions, Napoleon was no less suspicious of Alexander. Partly to test his sincerity, Napoleon sent an almost peremptory request for the hand of the grand-duchess Anna Pavlovna, the tsar's youngest sister. After some little delay Alexander returned a polite refusal, pleading the princess's tender age and the objection of the dowager empress to the marriage. Napoleon's answer was to refuse to ratify the 4 January convention, and to announce his engagement to the archduchess Marie Louise in such a way as to lead Alexander to suppose that the two marriage treaties had been negotiated simultaneously. From this time on, the relationship between the two emperors gradually became more and more strained.

Another personal grievance for Alexander towards Napoleon was the annexation of Oldenburg by France in December 1810, as the Duke of Oldenburg (3 January 17542 July 1823) was the uncle of the tsar. Furthermore, the disastrous impact of the Continental System on Russian trade made it impossible for the emperor to maintain a policy that was Napoleon's chief motive for the alliance.

Alexander kept Russia as neutral as possible in the ongoing French war with Britain. He did, however, allow trade to continue secretly with Britain and did not enforce the blockade required by the Continental System. In 1810, he withdrew Russia from the Continental System and trade between Britain and Russia grew.

Relations between France and Russia worsened progressively after 1810. By 1811, it became clear that Napoleon was not adhering to his side of the terms of the Treaty of Tilsit. He had promised assistance to Russia in its war against the Ottoman Empire, but as the campaign went on, France offered no support at all.

With war imminent between France and Russia, Alexander started to prepare the ground diplomatically. In April 1812, Russia and Sweden signed an agreement for mutual defence. A month later, Alexander secured his southern flank through the Treaty of Bucharest (1812), which ended the war against the Ottomans formally. His diplomats managed to extract promises from Prussia and Austria that should Napoleon invade Russia, the former would help Napoleon as little as possible and that the latter would give no aid at all.

The minister of war, Barclay de Tolly, had managed the reform and improvement of the Russian land forces before the start of the 1812 campaign. Primarily on the advice of his sister and Count Aleksey Arakcheyev, Alexander did not take operational control as he had done during the 1805 campaign, instead delegating control to his generals, Michael Barclay de Tolly, Prince Pyotr Bagration and Mikhail Kutuzov.

War against Persia

Despite brief hostilities in the Persian Expedition of 1796, eight years of peace passed before a new conflict erupted between the two empires. After the Russian annexation of Georgia in 1801, a subject of Persia for centuries, and the incorporation of the Derbent khanate as well quickly thereafter, Alexander was determined to increase and maintain Russian influence in the strategically valuable Caucasus region. In 1801, Alexander appointed Pavel Tsitsianov, a die-hard Russian imperialist of Georgian origin, as Russian commander in chief of the Caucasus. Between 1802 and 1804 he proceeded to impose Russian rule on Western Georgia and some of the Persian controlled khanates around Georgia. Some of these khanates submitted without a fight, but the Ganja Khanate resisted, prompting an attack. Ganja was ruthlessly sacked during the siege of Ganja, with some 3,000
7,000
 inhabitants of Ganja executed, and thousands more expelled to Persia. These attacks by Tsitsianov formed another casus belli.

On 23 May 1804, Persia demanded withdrawal from the regions Russia had occupied, comprising what is now Georgia, Dagestan, and parts of Azerbaijan. Russia refused, stormed Ganja, and declared war. Following an almost ten-year stalemate centred around what is now Dagestan, east Georgia, Azerbaijan, northern Armenia, with neither party being able to gain the clear upper hand, Russia eventually managed to turn the tide. After a series of successful offensives led by General Pyotr Kotlyarevsky, including a decisive victory in the storming of Lankaran, Persia was forced to sue for peace. In October 1813, the Treaty of Gulistan, negotiated with British mediation and signed at Gulistan, made the Persian Shah Fath Ali Shah cede all Persian territories in the North Caucasus and most of its territories in the South Caucasus to Russia. This included what is now Dagestan, Georgia, and most of Azerbaijan. It also began a large demographic shift in the Caucasus, as many Muslim families emigrated to Persia

French invasion

In the summer of 1812 Napoleon invaded Russia. It was the occupation of Moscow and the desecration of the Kremlin, considered to be the sacred centre of Holy Russia, that changed Alexander's sentiment for Napoleon into passionate hatred. The campaign of 1812 was the turning point for Alexander's life; after the burning of Moscow, he declared that his own soul had found illumination, and that he had realized once and for all the divine revelation to him of his mission as the peacemaker of Europe.

While the Russian army retreated deep into Russia for almost three months, the nobility pressured Alexander to relieve the commander of the Russian army, Field Marshal Barclay de Tolly. Alexander complied and appointed Prince Mikhail Kutuzov to take over command of the army. The battle that followed was the largest and bloodiest single-day action of the Napoleonic Wars, involving more than 250,000 soldiers and resulting in 70,000 casualties. The outcome of the battle was inconclusive. The Russian army, undefeated in spite of heavy losses, was able to withdraw the following day, leaving the French without the decisive victory Napoleon sought.

A week later Napoleon entered Moscow, but there was no delegation to meet the Emperor. The Russians had evacuated the city, and the city's governor, Count Fyodor Rostopchin, ordered several strategic points in Moscow to be set ablaze. The loss of Moscow did not compel Alexander to sue for peace. After staying in the city for a month, Napoleon moved his army out southwest toward Kaluga, where Kutuzov was encamped with the Russian army. The French advance toward Kaluga was checked by the Russian army, and Napoleon was forced to retreat to the areas already devastated by the invasion. In the weeks that followed the  starved and suffered from the onset of the Russian Winter. Lack of food and fodder for the horses and persistent attacks upon isolated troops from Russian peasants and Cossacks  led to great losses. When the remnants of the French army eventually crossed  the Berezina River in November, only 27,000 soldiers remained; the  had lost some 380,000 men dead and 100,000 captured. Following the crossing of the Berezina, Napoleon left the army and returned to Paris to protect his position as Emperor and to raise more forces to resist the advancing Russians. The campaign ended on 14 December 1812, with the last French troops finally leaving Russian soil.

The campaign was a turning point in the Napoleonic Wars. Napoleon's reputation was severely shaken, and French hegemony in Europe was weakened. The , made up of French and allied forces, was reduced to a fraction of its initial strength. These events triggered a major shift in European politics. France's ally Prussia, soon followed by Austria, broke their imposed alliance with Napoleon and switched sides, triggering the War of the Sixth Coalition.

War of the Sixth Coalition

With the Russian army following up victory over Napoleon in 1812, the Sixth Coalition was formed with Russia, Austria, Prussia, Great Britain, Sweden, Spain, and other nations. Although the French were victorious in the initial battles during the campaign in Germany, they were eventually defeated at the Battle of Leipzig in the autumn of 1813, which proved to be a decisive victory. Following the battle, the Pro-French Confederation of the Rhine collapsed, thereby losing Napoleon's hold on territory east of the Rhine. Alexander, being the supreme commander of the Coalition forces in the theatre and the paramount monarch among the three main Coalition monarchs, ordered all Coalition forces in Germany to cross the Rhine and invade France.

The Coalition forces, divided into three groups, entered northeastern France in January 1814. Facing them in the theatre were the French forces numbering only about 70,000 men. In spite of being heavily outnumbered, Napoleon defeated the divided Coalition forces in the battles at Brienne and La Rothière, but could not stop the Coalition's advance. Austrian emperor Francis I and King Frederick William III of Prussia felt demoralized upon hearing about Napoleon's victories since the start of the campaign. They even considered ordering a general retreat. But Alexander was far more determined than ever to victoriously enter Paris whatever the cost, imposing his will upon Karl Philipp, Prince of Schwarzenberg, and the wavering monarchs. On 28 March, Coalition forces advanced towards Paris, and the city surrendered on 31 March. Until this battle it had been nearly 400 years since a foreign army had entered Paris, during the Hundred Years' War.

Camping outside the city on 29 March, the Coalition armies were to assault the city from its northern and eastern sides the next morning on 30 March. The battle started that same morning with intense artillery bombardment from the Coalition positions. Early in the morning the Coalition attack began when the Russians attacked and drove back the French skirmishers near Belleville before being driven back themselves by French cavalry from the city's eastern suburbs. By 7:00 a.m. the Russians attacked the Young Guard near Romainville in the centre of the French lines and after some time and hard fighting, pushed them back. A few hours later the Prussians, under Gebhard Leberecht von Blücher, attacked north of the city and carried the French position around Aubervilliers, but did not press their attack. The Württemberg troops seized the positions at Saint-Maur to the southwest, with Austrian troops in support. The Russian forces then assailed the heights of Montmartre in the city's northeast. Control of the heights was severely contested, until the French forces surrendered.

Alexander sent an envoy to meet with the French to hasten the surrender. He offered generous terms to the French and although having intended to avenge Moscow, he declared himself to be bringing peace to France rather than its destruction. On 31 March Talleyrand gave the key of the city to the tsar. Later that day the Coalition armies triumphantly entered the city with Alexander at the head of the army followed by the King of Prussia and Prince Schwarzenberg. On 2 April, the Senate passed the Acte de déchéance de l'Empereur, which declared Napoleon deposed. Napoleon was in Fontainebleau when he heard that Paris had surrendered. Outraged, he wanted to march on the capital, but his marshals refused to fight for him and repeatedly urged him to surrender. He abdicated in favour of his son on 4 April, but the Allies rejected this out of hand, forcing Napoleon to abdicate unconditionally on 6 April. The terms of his abdication, which included his exile to the Isle of Elba, were settled in the Treaty of Fontainebleau on 11 April. A reluctant Napoleon ratified it two days later, marking the end of the War of the Sixth Coalition.

Postbellum

Peace of Paris and the Congress of Vienna
Alexander tried to calm the unrest of his conscience by correspondence with the leaders of the evangelical revival on the continent, and sought for omens and supernatural guidance in texts and passages of scripture. It was not, however, according to his own account, until he met the Baroness de Krüdener—a religious adventuress who made the conversion of princes her special mission—at Basel, in the autumn of 1813, that his soul found peace. From this time a mystic pietism became the avowed force of his political, as of his private actions. Madame de Krüdener, and her colleague, the evangelist Henri-Louis Empaytaz, became the confidants of the emperor's most secret thoughts; and during the campaign that ended in the occupation of Paris the imperial prayer-meetings were the oracle on whose revelations hung the fate of the world.

Such was Alexander's mood when the downfall of Napoleon left him one of the most powerful sovereigns in Europe. With the memory of the treaty of Tilsit still fresh in men's minds, it was not unnatural that to cynical men of the world like Klemens Wenzel von Metternich he merely seemed to be disguising "under the language of evangelical abnegation" vast and perilous schemes of ambition. The puzzled powers were, in fact, the more inclined to be suspicious in view of other, and seemingly inconsistent, tendencies of the emperor, which yet seemed all to point to a like disquieting conclusion. For Madame de Krüdener was not the only influence behind the throne; and, though Alexander had declared war against the Revolution, La Harpe (his erstwhile tutor) was once more at his elbow, and the catchwords of the gospel of humanity were still on his lips. The very proclamations which denounced Napoleon as "the genius of evil", denounced him in the name of "liberty," and of "enlightenment". Conservatives suspected Alexander of a monstrous intrigue by which the eastern autocrat would ally with the Jacobinism of all Europe, aiming at an all-powerful Russia in place of an all-powerful France. At the Congress of Vienna Alexander's attitude accentuated this distrust. Robert Stewart, Viscount Castlereagh, whose single-minded aim was the restoration of "a just equilibrium" in Europe, reproached the Tsar to his face for a "conscience" which led him to imperil the concert of the powers by keeping his hold on Poland in violation of his treaty obligation.

Liberal political views
Once a supporter of limited liberalism, as seen in his approval of the Constitution of the Kingdom of Poland in 1815, from the end of the year 1818 Alexander's views began to change. A revolutionary conspiracy among the officers of the guard, and a plot to kidnap him on his way to the Congress of Aix-la-Chapelle, are said to have shaken his liberal beliefs. At Aix he came for the first time into intimate contact with Metternich. From this time dates the ascendancy of Metternich over the mind of the Russian Emperor and in the councils of Europe. It was, however, no case of sudden conversion. Though alarmed by the revolutionary agitation in Germany, which culminated in the murder of his agent, the dramatist August von Kotzebue (23 March 1819), Alexander approved of Castlereagh's protest against Metternich's policy of "the governments contracting an alliance against the peoples", as formulated in the Carlsbad Decrees of July 1819, and deprecated any intervention of Europe to support "a league of which the sole object is the absurd pretensions of "absolute power".

He still declared his belief in "free institutions, though not in such as age forced from feebleness, nor contracts ordered by popular leaders from their sovereigns, nor constitutions granted in difficult circumstances to tide over a crisis." "Liberty", he maintained, "should be confined within just limits. And the limits of liberty are the principles of order".

It was the apparent triumph of the principles of disorder in the revolutions of Naples and Piedmont, combined with increasingly disquieting symptoms of discontent in France, Germany, and among his own people, that completed Alexander's conversion. In the seclusion of the little town of Troppau, where in October 1820 the powers met in conference, Metternich found an opportunity for cementing his influence over Alexander, which had been wanting amid the turmoil and intrigues of Vienna and Aix. Here, in confidence begotten of friendly chats over afternoon tea, the disillusioned autocrat confessed his mistake. "You have nothing to regret," he said sadly to the exultant chancellor, "but I have!".

The issue was momentous. In January Alexander had still upheld the ideal of a free confederation of the European states, symbolised by the Holy Alliance, against the policy of a dictatorship of the great powers, symbolised by the Quadruple Treaty; he had still protested against the claims of collective Europe to interfere in the internal concerns of the sovereign states. On 19 November he signed the Troppau Protocol, which consecrated the principle of intervention and wrecked the harmony of the concert.

Revolt of the Greeks 

At the Congress of Laibach, which had been adjourned in the spring of 1821, Alexander received news of the Greek revolt against the Ottoman Empire. From this time until his death, Alexander's mind was conflicted between his dreams of a stable confederation of Europe and his traditional mission as leader of the Orthodox crusade against the Ottomans. At first, under the careful advice of Metternich, Alexander chose the former.

Siding against the Greek revolt for the sake of stability in the region, Alexander expelled its leader Alexander Ypsilantis from the Russian Imperial Cavalry, and directed his foreign minister, Ioannis Kapodistrias (known as Giovanni, Count Capo d'Istria), himself a Greek, to disavow any Russian sympathy with Ypsilantis; and in 1822, he issued orders to turn back a deputation from the Greek Morea province to the Congress of Verona on the road.

He made some effort to reconcile the principles at conflict in his mind. The Ottoman Sultan Mahmud II had been excluded from the Holy Alliance under the principle that the affairs of the East were the "domestic concerns of Russia" rather than of the concert of Europe; but Alexander now offered to surrender this claim and act "as the mandatory of Europe," as Austria had acted in Naples, but still to march as a Christian liberator into the Ottoman Empire.

Metternich's opposition to this assertion of Russian power, putting the Austrian-led balance of power above the interests of Christendom, first opened Alexander's eyes to the true character of Austria's attitude towards his ideals. Once more in Russia, far from the fascination of Metternich's personality, he was once again moved by the aspirations of his people.

In 1823 the 1817–1824 cholera pandemic reached Astrakhan and the Tsar ordered an anti-cholera campaign that was imitated in other countries.

Personal life

On 9 October 1793, Alexander married Louise of Baden, known as Elizabeth Alexeievna after her conversion to the Orthodox Church. He later told his friend Frederick William III that the marriage, a political match devised by his grandmother, Catherine the Great, regrettably proved to be a misfortune for him and his spouse. Their two children died young, though their common sorrow drew the spouses closer together. Towards the end of Alexander's life their reconciliation was completed by the wise charity of the Empress in sympathising deeply with him over the death of his beloved daughter Sophia Naryshkina, the daughter of his mistress Maria Naryshkina, with whom he had a relationship from 1799 until 1818. In 1809, Alexander I was widely and famously rumoured to have had an affair with the Finnish noblewoman Ulla Möllersvärd and to have had a child by her, but this is not confirmed.

Death
With his mental health deteriorating, Alexander grew increasingly suspicious of those around him, more withdrawn, more religious, and more passive. Some historians conclude his profile "coincides precisely with the schizophrenic prototype: a withdrawn, seclusive, rather shy, introvertive, unaggressive, and somewhat apathetic individual". In the autumn of 1825 the Emperor undertook a voyage to the south of Russia due to the increasing illness of his wife. During his trip he himself caught typhus, from which he died in the southern city of Taganrog on 19 November 1825(Old Style). However, his death wouldn't fully be known until December, due to Taganrog being far from the capital or any other large city.  His two brothers disputed who would become tsar—each wanted the other to do so. His wife died a few months later as the emperor's body was transported to Saint Petersburg for the funeral. He was interred at the St. Peter and Paul Cathedral of the Peter and Paul Fortress in Saint Petersburg on 13 March 1826. There are many rumours and legends, of which the most often told claimed that he did not die but rather became a Siberian hermit named Feodor Kuzmich.  Historians reject the legends, but popular writers resurrect them often.

Children

Archives
Alexander's letters to his grandfather, Frederick II Eugene, Duke of Württemberg, (together with letters from his siblings) written between 1795 and 1797, are preserved in the State Archive of Stuttgart (Hauptstaatsarchiv Stuttgart) in Stuttgart, Germany.

Honours

He received the following orders and decorations:

Ancestry

See also
 Aleksey Arakcheyev
 Archimandrite Photius

Notes

References

 
 

 

 
 
 

 
 
 

 
 
 
 
 

 
 
 

 

 

 
 
 
Attribution:

Further reading

 Hartley, Janet M. et al. eds. Russia and the Napoleonic Wars (2015), new scholarship
 Lieven, Dominic. Russia Against Napoleon (2011) excerpt
 McConnell, Allen. Tsar Alexander I: Paternalistic Reformer (1970) online free to borrow
 Palmer, Alan. Alexander I: Tsar of War and Peace (Faber & Faber, 2014).
 Rey, Marie-Pierre. Alexander I.: the Tsar who defeated Napoleon (2012)
 Zawadzki, Hubert. "Between Napoleon and Tsar Alexander: The Polish Question at Tilsit, 1807." Central Europe 7.2 (2009): 110–124.

External links
 

1777 births
1825 deaths
19th-century Russian monarchs
19th-century Polish monarchs
Russian emperors
Rulers of Finland
Russian grand dukes
Tsesarevichs of Russia
Russian commanders of the Napoleonic Wars
 
House of Holstein-Gottorp-Romanov
Alexander I of Russia
Deaths from typhus
Burials at Saints Peter and Paul Cathedral, Saint Petersburg
Infectious disease deaths in Russia

Recipients of the Order of St. Anna, 1st class
Extra Knights Companion of the Garter
Knights of the Golden Fleece of Spain
Grand Croix of the Légion d'honneur
Knights Grand Cross of the Military Order of William
Knights Grand Cross of the Order of the Sword
3
3
3
Knights Cross of the Military Order of Maria Theresa
Children of Paul I of Russia
Sons of emperors
R